Jean Pellissier (born 30 July 1972) is an Italian ski mountaineer, mountain runner and sky runner.

Career 
Pellissier started ski mountaineering in 1997 and competed first in the Mezzalama Trophy race in the same year. He has been member of the national team since 2002. Since finishing his professional career he runs a mountain equipment store in Martigny.

Selected results 
 2003:
 1st, Sellaronda Skimarathon (together with Luca Negroni)
 1st, Trofeo "Rinaldo Maffeis" (together with Luca Negroni)
 9th, European Championship team race (together with Carlo Battel)
 2004:
 2nd, World Championship team race (together with Carlo Battel)
 4th, World Championship vertical race
 5th, World Championship combination ranking
 10th, World Championshipsingle race
 2005:
 5th, European Championship team race (together with Carlo Battel)
 2006:
 6th, World Championship team race (together with Carlo Battel)
 2007:
 3rd, European Championship team race (together with Guido Giacomelli)

Pierra Menta 

 2000: 7th, together with Vincent Meilleur
 2002: 7th, together with Olivier Nägele
 2005: 3rd, together with Guido Giacomelli
 2007: 7th, together with Martin Riz
 2012: 9th, together with Tony Sbalbi

Trofeo Mezzalama 

 1999: 6th, together with Giuseppe Ouvrier and Ettore Champrétavy
 2001: 2nd, together with Fabio Meraldi and Stéphane Brosse
 2003: 2nd, together with Stéphane Brosse and Pierre Gignoux
 2005: 3rd, together with Manfred Reichegger and Dennis Brunod
 2007: 1st, together with Guido Giacomelli and Florent Troillet
 2009: 2nd, together with Damiano Lenzi and Daniele Pedrini
 2011: 7th, together with Guido Giacomelli and Lorenzo Holzknecht

Patrouille des Glaciers 

 2000: 8th (and 3rd in "seniors II" ranking), Patrouille des Glaciers, together with Giuseppe Ouvrier and Ettore Champrétavy
 2004: 1st and course record, together with Patrick Blanc and Stéphane Brosse

External links 
 Jean Pellissier at skimountaineering.org

References 

1972 births
Living people
Italian male ski mountaineers
People from Aosta
Italian female mountain runners
Italian sky runners
Sportspeople from Aosta Valley